Dezvand or Dezavand, also rendered as Dezeh Vand or Dizawan or Dizeh Vand, may refer to:
 Dezvand-e Olya
 Dezvand-e Sofla